"Better Days" is a song by Swedish music collective Neiked, featuring English singer-songwriter Mae Muller and American rapper Polo G. It was released on 24 September 2021 via Capitol Records. The song was written by Karl Ivert, Kian Sang, Polo G, Von Tiger and Neiked, who also produced it. It also went viral on TikTok as part of the "Better Days challenge", which helped the song garner over one million streams. The song was later remixed by Colombian rapper J Balvin.

Content
In a press release, Universal Music Canada described the song as "a dreamy, upbeat slice of pop perfection that is filled with joy and hope". Out Now felt that it is "a high-energy pop anthem whose optimistic outlook is undeniably catchy". The song is written in the key of C Minor, with a tempo of 110 beats per minute.

Music video
An accompanying music video was released on 7 October 2021, and directed by Tom Dream. It showcases the three artists "living in a retro world with Mae Muller taking center stage".

Track listing and formats
Digital download / streaming
 "Better Days" 2:40

Digital download – Acoustic
 "Better Days" (Acoustic) 2:55

Streaming – Acoustic
 "Better Days" (Acoustic) 2:55
 "Better Days" 2:40

Digital download / streaming – Regard remix
 "Better Days" (Regard Remix) 2:46

Digital download / streaming – extended play
 "Better Days" (with J Balvin) 3:42
 "Better Days" 2:40
 "Better Days" (Regard Remix) 2:46
 "Better Days" (Acoustic) 2:55

Credits and personnel
Credits adapted from AllMusic.

 Taurus Bartlett – vocals
 Elin Bergman – composer
 Clint Gibbs – mixing
 Karl Ivert – composer 
 Mae Muller – primary artist, vocals
 Neiked – composer, primary artist, producer
 Polo G – composer, primary artist
 Victor Rådström – programming
 Kian Sang – composer

Charts

Weekly charts

Year-end charts

Certifications

Release history

Footnotes

References

2021 songs
2021 singles
Neiked songs
Capitol Records singles
Mae Muller songs
Polo G songs
Song recordings produced by Neiked
Songs written by Mae Muller
Songs written by Polo G